Robert Trowbridge Hartmann (April 8, 1917 – April 11, 2008) was an American political advisor, speechwriter and reporter, who served as Chief of Staff for Vice President Gerald Ford and Counselor to the President when Ford was elevated to the presidency in 1974.

Early life and career
Hartmann was born April 8, 1917, in Rapid City, South Dakota, the only child of Miner Louis and Elizabeth Trowbridge Hartmann. His father was a chemical engineer and a patent lawyer. Hartmann grew up in Upstate New York and Southern California.

He joined the Los Angeles Times as a reporter in 1939, a year after graduating from Stanford University.

During World War II, he worked in public relations and press censorship roles for the Navy in the Pacific. He retired from the Navy Reserve in 1977 with the rank of captain.

Resuming his career at the Times after the war, he was Washington bureau chief from 1954 to 1963 and finished his newspaper career the next year after opening the Rome bureau.

Early political career
After leaving the Times, Hartmann became an information adviser for the United Nations Food and Agriculture Organization. In 1966, he went to work for the House Republican Conference as a press aide.

In 1969, Hartmann joined the staff of then-Minority Leader Gerald Ford as a Legislative Assistant, rising to become one of Ford's most trusted advisors.

Chief of Staff to the Vice President

After President Nixon nominated Gerald Ford to be Vice President on October 12, 1973, Hartmann coordinated Ford's preparations for the confirmation hearings on the nomination. He then became Vice President Ford's chief of staff. It soon became obvious that the burden of administrative matters—hiring staff, finding office space, etc. -- kept Hartmann from devoting sufficient time to speeches, political liaison, and advising the Vice President. Ford solved this problem by hiring L. William Seidman as an assistant for administration, which left Hartmann to advise Ford on political matters.

Counselor to the President
When Gerald Ford succeeded to the presidency on August 9, 1974, he quickly named Hartmann as Counselor to the President, with Cabinet status.  In this position, one of Hartmann's main responsibilities was supervision of the editorial Staff in the preparation of presidential speeches, statements, messages, and correspondence. He also handled White House liaison with Republican Party organizations and advised President Ford on a wide variety of matters that went beyond his formal duties.

Hartmann drafted President Ford's address to the nation upon taking office, coining the phrase "long national nightmare" to describe the Watergate scandal and resignation of Nixon.

Later life and career
After Ford left office, Hartmann served as a senior research fellow at the Hoover Institution at his alma mater Stanford, and a trustee of the Gerald R. Ford Foundation.

In 1980, he wrote his autobiography, Palace Politics, focusing on his time at the White House.

References

External links

|-

|-

1917 births
2008 deaths
United States Navy personnel of World War II
Journalists from California
California Republicans
Counselors to the President
Los Angeles Times people
Ford administration cabinet members
Nixon administration personnel
Writers from California
Speechwriters for presidents of the United States
Stanford University alumni
White House Directors of Speechwriting
United States Navy captains
United States Navy reservists
20th-century American journalists
American male journalists